Mei-Fu Zhou is a Chinese geologist.

He graduated from Nanjing University in 1983, and pursued graduate study in Canada, where he earned a master's degree from the University of Saskatchewan in 1992, followed by a doctorate from Dalhousie University in 1995. Zhou began teaching at the University of Hong Kong in 1996. Zhou is a fellow of the Geological Society of America and the chief editor of the Journal of Asian Earth Sciences.

References

Living people
Dalhousie University alumni
Nanjing University alumni
University of Saskatchewan alumni
Academic staff of the University of Hong Kong
Academic journal editors
Fellows of the Geological Society of America
21st-century Chinese geologists
Year of birth missing (living people)